Anne Bourguignon (9 August 1950 – 30 April 2019), known professionally as Anémone, was a French actress, filmmaker and political activist. She took her stage name in 1968 from the title of her film debut in Philippe Garrel's Anémone.

Career
Born in Paris, Anémone is associated with "Le Splendid", a group of actors and filmmakers who have been a force in French film and theatre since their beginnings in the 1970s, and she appeared in film Le Père Noël est une ordure (1982), although this was at the end her association with the group. In 1988, she was awarded a César Award for Best Actress for her role in Le Grand Chemin, directed by Jean-Loup Hubert. She won one César Award of five nominations.

Anémone died following a long illness on 30 April 2019, at the age of 68.

Filmography

Awards and nominations

References

External links

 Anémone at hollywood.com
 

1950 births
2019 deaths
Actresses from Paris
Best Actress César Award winners
Deaths from lung cancer in France
French film actresses
20th-century French actresses
21st-century French actresses